Pau-Brasil Ecological Station may refer to one of two ecological stations protecting stands of Brazil Wood (Pau Brasil):

 Pau-Brasil Ecological Station (Bahia)
 Pau-Brasil Ecological Station (Paraíba)